Qwabe Twins is a South African  Afro-pop duo formed in KwaZulu-Natal consisting of two identical twins Virginia and Viggy Qwabe. They were contestant on season 15 of the Idols South Africa.

Q Twins signed a record deal with Afrotaiment Records, released their debut studio album The Gift of Love (2020).

Their second studio album Words of Hope (2022), debuted number 3 in South Africa.

Career

Idols South Africa
In 2019, Qwabe  Twins  competed on season 15 of Idols South Africa. Virginia Qwabe performed "Khona" by Mafikizolo featuring Uhuru on the Top 5 and was eliminated. Soon after her sister elimination Viggy withdrew.

2020-present: The Gift of Love
Shortly after their exit  on Idols South Africa, they signed a record deal with Afrotaiment Records  and released their breakthrough hit single "Hamba" featuring DJ Tira on November 29, 2019. The song music video amassed 5 Million views on YouTube  and scooped award at the 2021 Afrotaiment awards. Q Twins was nominated for Newest Find at the 2020 KZN Entertainment Awards. In September 18, their single "Show Me" featuring Jaziel Brothers was released.  On September 25, 2020, their debut studio album The Gift of Love was released in South Africa. At the 15th ceremony of South African Traditional Music Awards, they were nominated for Best Traditional House Music Song  and won two awards Female Artist/Group (The Gift of Love ) and Best Traditional Collaboration Song.

In October 2021, their single "Ziyakhala" featuring Kabza De Small was released.

Their second studio album Words of Hope was released on November 17, 2021. It reached number 3 on iTunes Top Albums.

Discography

Studio albums 
 The Gift of Love (2020)
 Words of Hope (2022)

Achievements

KZN Entertainment Awards 

! 
|-
|2020
| 
| Newest Find
|
|

South African Traditional Music Awards 

!
|-
|rowspan="3"|2021
|  The Gift of Love 
| Best Female Artist/Group
|
| rowspan="3"|
|-
| "Laba Abantu"
|Best Traditional Collaboration Song 
|
|-
|"Umuhle"
|
|

References 

1997 births
People from KwaZulu-Natal
Living people
Twin musical duos
Identical twin females
Female musical duos